The Taraba State Executive Council (also known as, the Cabinet of Taraba State) is the highest formal governmental body that plays important roles in the Government of Taraba State headed by the Governor of Taraba State. It consists of the Deputy Governor, Secretary to the State Government, Chief of Staff, Commissioners who preside over ministerial departments, and (with the consent of the legislative arm of the government) the Governor's special aides.

Functions
The Executive Council exists to advise and direct the Governor. Their appointment as members of the Executive Council gives them the authority to execute power over their fields.

Current cabinet
The current Executive Council is serving under the Darius Dickson Ishaku administration.

References

Taraba
Taraba State